Ashley Connor is an American cinematographer who is best known for her work on films such as Madeline's Madeline, The Miseducation of Cameron Post, The Death of Dick Long, and Thou Wast Mild and Lovely. She was nominated for an Independent Spirit Award in 2019 for Best Cinematography.

Career
Growing up, Ashley played a lot of sports but at the age of fifteen she damaged her knees. Following surgery, she mainly watched movies till an interest in film as a profession arose. She gained major traction from one of her earlier films, Thou Wast Mild and Lovely, where she was first noticed as a great user of the handheld technique. Most of her films are primarily improvised, so she shoots conversations in a way opposite to the 'shot/reverse shot style'. Her career continued to progress to the point of being a major speaker at the 2020 SXSW. She's also given masterclasses for Seventh Row, most recently during the first covid lockdown.

In the midst of shooting major films, she is known to shoot music videos for the likes of Jemima Kirke, Alex Cameron, others.

Filmography

References

External links
Ashley Connor - IMDb
Ashley Connor - MUBI
NoFilmSchool
NY Lincoln Center Interview

Living people
American cinematographers
1987 births